The Lands’ Advocate of Holland acted as the Chairman of the States of Holland. The office started in the early 14th century and ended in 1619, when the title was renamed into Grand Pensionary. He was the speaker of the nobility of Holland and had the first say on a subject during a meeting of the Estates. A decision of the Estates was made by a summarizing of all the statements of the other delegates by the Lands’ Advocate. The Lands’ Advocate of Holland was the most powerful man of the United Provinces when there was no Stadtholder in Holland (because two-thirds of the tax income of the republic came from the county of Holland).

The most powerful lands’ advocates of Holland were the last two, Paulus Buys (1572–1584) and Johan van Oldenbarnevelt (1586–1619).

County of Holland
1619 disestablishments
Heads of government of non-sovereign entities
Government ministers of the Netherlands
1610s disestablishments in the Dutch Republic
Political history of the Dutch Republic
14th-century establishments in the Burgundian Netherlands
Legislative speakers in the Netherlands